Background noise or ambient noise is any sound other than the sound being monitored (primary sound). Background noise is a form of noise pollution or interference. Background noise is an important concept in setting noise levels.

Background noises include environmental noises such as water waves, traffic noise, alarms, extraneous speech, bioacoustic noise from animals, and electrical noise from devices such as refrigerators, air conditioning, power supplies, and motors.

The prevention or reduction of background noise is important in the field of active noise control. It is an important consideration with the use of ultrasound (e.g. for medical diagnosis or imaging), sonar, and sound reproduction.

Other uses
In astronomy, background noise or cosmic background radiation is electromagnetic radiation from the sky with no discernible source.

In information architecture, irrelevant, duplicate or incorrect information may be called background noise.

In physics and telecommunication, background signal noise can be detrimental or in some cases beneficial. The study of avoiding, reducing or using signal noise is information theory.

In telephony, artificial comfort noise is used as a substitute for natural background noise, to fill in artificial silence created by discontinuous transmission systems using voice activity detection.
Background noise can also affect concentration.

See also
4'33"
Ambient noise level
Electronic noise
The Hum
Colors of noise
Sound masking

External links
How low noise levels are achieved in concert halls
Background noise in acoustics (demo)

Acoustics
Noise pollution
Sound